Royal Dutch may refer to:

Royal Dutch Petroleum Company, oil and gas company and predecessor to Shell plc
Royal Dutch Airlines, commonly known as KLM

See also
Monarchy of the Netherlands